DDH may refer to:

 1,3-Dibromo-5,5-dimethylhydantoin, a chemical also abbreviated as DBDMH
 Ddh (trigraph), a trigraph used in the Dene Suline language for the dental affricate /tθ/
 De Danske Husmoderforeninger, Danish women's organization
 Decisional Diffie–Hellman assumption
 Department of Digital Humanities, at King's College London (formerly Centre for Computing in the Humanities)
 Developmental Dysplasia of the Hip, see Hip dysplasia (human)
 Devonshire Dock Hall, the BAE Systems assembly facility
 Disciples Divinity House, Christian seminary of the University of Chicago 
 DDH is hull classification symbol for helicopter carrier or helicopter destroyer